Howard City refers to multiple settlements in the United States:

Howard City, Michigan
Howard City, Nebraska, also called Boelus